Leeson Point is a conspicuous ice-covered coastal feature forming the northeast corner of Montagu Island, South Sandwich Islands. It was named by the UK Antarctic Place-Names Committee for Lieutenant John Leeson, Royal Navy, Senior Pilot in HMS Protector's ship's flight during survey of these islands in 1964.

References

External links

Headlands of South Georgia and the South Sandwich Islands